Bridge over Powder River may refer to the following bridges:
CKW Bridge over Powder River, near Arvada, Wyoming
EBF Bridge over Powder River, near Leiter, Wyoming